Neye may refer to:

 Neye (company), Danish company
 Walther Neye (1901 – 1989), German lawyer and rector of Berlin's Humboldt University
 Neye (Wupper), a river of North Rhine-Westphalia, Germany
 Kafr Naya or Kefer Neye, a town in northern Aleppo Governorate, northwestern Syria